The following is a list of modern Russian small arms and light weapons which were in service in 2016:

Handguns

Revolvers

Pistols

Special purpose

Submachine guns

Special purpose

Shotguns

Rifles

Bolt-action

Semi-automatic

Selective-fire

Special purpose

Anti-materiel rifles

Machine guns

Squad automatic weapons (SAWs)

General-purpose

Heavy

Hand grenades

Fragmentation

Anti-tank

Grenade launchers

Stand-alone

Attached

Automatic grenade launchers

Rocket launchers

General purpose

Incendiary and thermobaric

Special purpose

Recoilless rifles

Mortars

Anti-tank guided missiles

Man-portable air defense system

Landmines

See also 

 List of equipment of the Russian Ground Forces
 List of Russian weaponry makers

References 

Weapons of Russia
Lists of weapons
 
Weapons
Lists of military equipment